"Screenless" is the 15th episode of the thirty-first season of the American animated television series The Simpsons, and the 677th episode overall. It aired in the United States on Fox on March 8, 2020. The episode was written by J. Stewart Burns and was directed by Michael Polcino. It was dedicated to James Lipton who died on March 2, 2020, and had guest starred in the episodes "The Sweetest Apu" and "Homer the Father" respectively.

Plot
The Simpson family is watching Marketing a Murder on TV. When Maggie tries to get their attention, Lisa switches to Baby Ein-sign, a show teaching babies sign language. Maggie was trying to tell them that Hans Moleman was stuck under a fallen tree in their yard, which they fail to notice. In the morning, they keep watching the show while Hans is taken into an ambulance.

The show is cancelled due to government stopping funding the show, before Maggie can completely learn to use sign language, so the family attempts to teach her themselves. When Maggie begins to use sign language on her own, Marge tries to tell the family about Maggie's development, only to find them uninterested and playing on their devices, so Marge stops them and limits their time on the devices to half an hour a week for everyone.

When Homer, Bart and Lisa cheat by having the Wise Guy revert their screentime, Marge puts the devices away entirely. Bored at work, Homer becomes an expert in word jumble puzzles, Marge sees how the devices affect the lives of Patty and Selma, Bart starts to use his imagination when he recovers a rocket from the school's roof, involving Jimbo and Dolph too, and Lisa rediscovers the joy of finding books manually.

Marge cannot find recipes on her books and fails to get help from Luigi, so when the family returns home they find her in her closet with her phone and laptop, finding out she is the addicted one. Finally admitting she has a problem, she signs herself and the family up for a month at the Screen Addiction Rehab Center.

The next day they arrive at the center, finding out it is a paradise. The owner Dr. Lund shows them various activities. They start healing, but they cannot hold on for long. They also discover the workers all use computers, sending spam mails after stealing patients' accounts. In addition, the family signed a non-disclosure contract, which also prevents them from being able to leave the center.

At night, the family work together, using sign language for communication, and manage to stealthily escape the center undetected and get a ride home on Jimbo and Dolph's makeshift rocket. The next day, Lund is arrested by the police for his scams. Lund offers to help Chief Wiggum with his compulsive overeating.

Reception
Dennis Perkins of The A.V. Club gave this episode a B−, stating that “Alas, there’s not enough else to recommend ‘Screenless,’ as the Simpsons’ individual journeys through the hell of online withdrawal are short-changed and unsatisfying. Homer gets good at newspaper jumbles, which has one truncated but lovely little montage sequence where the glimpse of Homer J. Simpson recognizing some hidden talent inside himself is set to evocative music...Lisa briefly rediscovers the musty, dusty, opossum-infested joys of the library’s neglected card catalog. Bart, like Homer, has the merest hint of a personal arc when he alone among his phone-tapping peers spies a forgotten toy rocket on the school roof and, retrieving it, rediscovers his atrophied imagination.”.

Den of Geek gave this episode 3.5 out of 5 stars

References

External links
 

The Simpsons (season 31) episodes
2020 American television episodes